Rainbow SkyReach (Pty) Ltd is a South African aircraft manufacturer based at the Springs Airfield in Dal Fouche, Springs, Gauteng. It was formerly known as Rainbow Aircraft (Pty) Ltd. The company specialises in the design and manufacture of fixed-wing Light-sport aircraft.

The company was founded by Mike Blyth in South Africa as Rainbow Aircraft (Pty) Ltd. Vladimir Chechin came as a visitor to the country from Russia in 1994 and decided to immigrate, finding work at Blyth's company. In 2002 Chechin purchased the company from Blyth.

The company's name was changed to Rainbow SkyReach (Pty) Ltd in the 2010s and the Rainbow Cheetah was developed into the SkyReach BushCat.

Aircraft

References

External links

Aircraft manufacturers of South Africa
Companies based in Ekurhuleni
Springs, Gauteng
South African brands